Sprint is a live album by the Red Rodney and Ira Sullivan Quintet which was recorded in 1982 and released on the Elektra/Musician label the following year.

Reception

The AllMusic review by Scott Yanow stated "The last of six LPs by the Red Rodney-Ira Sullivan Quintet was also the band's finest. There are times in the music where the group sounds like the early Ornette Coleman Quartet. The setting and advanced repertoire clearly challenged Rodney and inspired Sullivan. A post-bop gem, one of Rodney's finest recordings".

Track listing
All compositions by Garry Dial except where noted.
 "How Do You Know" – 7:23
 "As Time Goes By" (Herman Hupfeld) – 7:35
 "Sprint" – 7:36
 "My Son, the Minstrel" – 6:05
 "Speak Like a Child" (Herbie Hancock) – 11:46

Personnel
Red Rodney – trumpet, flugelhorn
Ira Sullivan - flute, soprano saxophone, alto saxophone, flugelhorn
Garry Dial – piano
Jay Anderson – bass
Jeff Hirshfield – drums

References

Elektra/Musician live albums
Red Rodney live albums
Ira Sullivan live albums
1983 live albums
Albums produced by Mike Berniker